Mark Eugene Stuart (born April 27, 1984) is an American ice hockey coach and former professional defenseman. He played for the Boston Bruins and the Atlanta Thrashers/Winnipeg Jets of the National Hockey League (NHL) and Adler Mannheim in the Deutsche Eishockey Liga (DEL). He was drafted by the Boston Bruins 21st overall in the first round of the 2003 NHL Entry Draft. He is the younger brother of former NHL forward, Colin and defenseman Mike, and is the son of Mayo Clinic physician Michael Stuart.

Playing career

Amateur
Stuart attended Colorado College in Colorado Springs for three years prior to going pro. Stuart likely would have left a year earlier had the NHL not been involved in a lockout. During his junior year, Stuart was the captain of the Tigers and led them to the NCAA Frozen Four, where they lost to eventual champion and in-state rival, the University of Denver.

Professional
On November 7, 2006, after undergoing off-season knee surgery, Stuart was sent down to the Boston Bruins' American Hockey League affiliate, the Providence Bruins for conditioning purposes until he was recalled by Boston on November 20, 2006.  After the conclusion of the 2007–08 Boston Bruins season, Mark Stuart was also selected to play in the 2008 IIHF World Ice Hockey Championships as a member of Team USA. Also, as of April 26, 2008 Stuart was named to be one of the alternate captains for Team USA in the 2008 international event.

On February 18, 2011, Stuart was traded by Boston to the Atlanta Thrashers along with Blake Wheeler for Rich Peverley and Boris Valabik. Ten days later, the team signed him to a three-year deal worth $5.1 million.  In 2011, Stuart's rights where transferred in the relocation of the Atlanta Thrashers to the Winnipeg Jets. During the 2012 NHL lockout, Stuart signed on to play for the Florida Everblades of the ECHL.   On March 5, 2014, Stuart signed a 4-year, $10.5 million contract extension with the Winnipeg Jets.

After seven seasons within the Thrashers/Jets franchise and after suffering a decline in his effectiveness throughout the 2016–17 season, Stuart was placed on waivers by the Jets in order to buy-out the remaining year of his contract on June 30, 2017.

On September 11, 2017, the Chicago Blackhawks signed Stuart to a professional tryout. On September 21, 2017, Stuart was released from the Blackhawks roster following training camp. 

On October 11, 2017, Stuart signed to play in Europe with Adler Mannheim of the Deutsche Eishockey Liga (DEL).

International play

Stuart first played for the United States during the 2002 IIHF World U18 Championships. He captained the United States to its first World U18 Championship gold medal. The next year, Stuart played in the 2003 World Junior Ice Hockey Championships where he had one assist in seven games. During the 2004 World Junior Ice Hockey Championships he had two assists and captained the United States to its first World Junior Championship gold medal.

In  2008, Stuart competed in the 2008 IIHF World Championship where he was one of the team's alternated captains. In 2011, he accepted an invitation to join the USA for the 2011 IIHF World Championship and was named team captain.

Career statistics

Regular season and playoffs

International

Awards and honors

References

External links

1984 births
Living people
Adler Mannheim players
AHCA Division I men's ice hockey All-Americans
American men's ice hockey defensemen
Atlanta Thrashers players
Boston Bruins draft picks
Boston Bruins players
Colorado College Tigers men's ice hockey players
Florida Everblades players
Ice hockey coaches from Minnesota
Ice hockey players from Minnesota
National Hockey League first-round draft picks
Providence Bruins players
Rochester Mustangs players
Sportspeople from Rochester, Minnesota
Stuart family
Winnipeg Jets players